Vitold Kaetanovich Byalynitsky-Birulya (in Krynki, (now Byalynichy District), Mogilev Region, Belarus – 18 June 1957 in Moscow) was a Soviet Belarusian landscape painter.

Biography 
Byalynitsky-Birulya originates from a noble Belarusian family, whose representatives are mentioned in the 16th century in connection with the Livonian War. His father served in the Dnieper shipping company allowing Byalynitsky-Birulya to travel with him on Belarusian rivers. His education began in Kyiv with cadet corps, after which he went to the famous Kiev drawing school Murashki, which was associated with the names of such artists as Repin, Vrubel, Serov and Malevich. At the age of 17, Byalynitsky-Birulya entered the Moscow School of Painting, Sculpture and Architecture. He got acquainted with Isaac Levitan, in whose studio he began to work.

In 1947, Byalynitsky-Birulya was elected into the USSR Academy of Arts. and became an Honorary Academician of the Academy of Sciences of Soviet Belarus.

Byalynitsky-Birulya has left a rich legacy - approximately 2000 paintings and sketches housed in various museums and private collections around the world. More than 450 of his paintings are kept in Belarus - in the National Art Museum of the Republic of Belarus, the Museum of Belynitsky-Birula in Mogilev, Art Museum named after Bialynichy-Birula in Byalynichy and others. The memory of Byalynitsky-Birulya is honored in the names of schools and streets in Mogilev and Byalynichy. A memorial sign has been erected in his honor at the Drut River on the site of the his birth place, former Krynki manor.

References

1872 births
1957 deaths
People from Byalynichy District
People from Mogilyovsky Uyezd (Mogilev Governorate)
Belarusian nobility
Landscape artists
Belarusian painters
Russian male painters
Soviet painters
Male painters
20th-century Belarusian painters
20th-century male artists
Belarusian male painters
20th-century Russian male artists
20th-century Russian painters
Full Members of the USSR Academy of Arts
Members of the Imperial Academy of Arts
People's Artists of the Byelorussian Soviet Socialist Republic (visual arts)
People's Artists of the RSFSR (visual arts)
Recipients of the Order of the Red Banner of Labour
Burials at Novodevichy Cemetery
Moscow School of Painting, Sculpture and Architecture alumni